Presidential elections were held in South Ossetia on 25 March 2012, with a second round on 8 April. The election selected the first president since the country gained partial international recognition.

Background
The date was set by the parliament after the 2011 election was annulled by the Supreme Court after Alla Dzhioyeva was disqualified following allegations of electoral violations by Anatoly Bibilov. A deal was reached on 9 December 2011 under which the incumbent Kokoity stepped down at the end of his mandate and was replaced by Prime Minister Vadim Brovtsev as acting president. Though Dzhioyeva was previously barred from running again, she was allowed to register in the re-run of the election. However, Kokoity and his supporters reneged on parts of the deal, calling into question the stability of the compromise.

Candidates
No candidate participating in the 2011 election registered, including the previous leaders Dzihoyeva and Bibilov. There were four registered candidates:
Leonid Haritonovich Tibilov, candidate in the 2006 election.
David Georgievich Sanakoev, human rights commissioner. 
Dmitriy Nikolayevich Medoyev, ambassador of South Ossetia to Russia and backed by Russia.
Stanislav Yakovlevich Kochiyev, chairman of the Communist Party of South Ossetia and speaker of the Parliament of South Ossetia.

Dzhioyeva did not register to run in the election after she was in hospital with allegations of being beaten and held against her will.

Campaign
Tibilov and Sanakoyev disagreed with former President Eduard Kokoity who said that South Ossetia would eventually be a part of Russia. Sanakoyev said: "In November–December [2011], it became very clear that those supported by Kokoity did not win. Everyone saw it."

Opinion poll
A week before the election, an opinion poll by the IR media centre suggested Medoyev or Tibilov would win.

Monitors
In addition to Russian observers the election commission said that it would call on the Council of Europe.

Results
With 40% of the votes counted, Tibilov was in the lead with 42.5% of the votes, Sanakoyev followed with 24.6% of the votes, Medoyev was third with 23.80% of the votes and Kochiyev trailed with 5.62% of votes counted. First round turnout was over 65%, with expatriate voting still to be counted. Without an absolute winner the election was set for a run off.

The second round occurred on Easter with 84 voting centres opening at 8:00 for the 35,000 registered voters. The preliminary result with 95.64% of the ballots counted, indicated Tibilov winning with 53.74%, or 15,257, of the votes, with Sanakoyev getting 42.98%, or 12,272, of the votes.

Reactions
After the first round, Tibilov said that "today's figures show that my candidacy is taken normally. Let's hope the second round confirms this." He also denied having Russian backing, but said that he would consult Russia in choosing his new government.

 – Deputy Foreign Minister Nino Kalandadze said that South Ossetia "staged a farce. No one will recognise these elections, no matter who wins."
Minister for Reintegration Eka Tkeshelashvili said of that the election that it was "a continuation of farce and an imitation of elections in the Russian-occupied ethnically-cleansed region."
 – After the first round, the Public Chamber's Maxim Grigoryev said that there were not "material breaches."
 – The embassy in Georgia said it does not recognise the election.

References

Presidential elections in South Ossetia
South Ossetia
2012 in South Ossetia